Biman Bangladesh Airlines subsidiaries include a number of ancillary and maintenance facilities established to facilitate operations of Biman Bangladesh Airlines, the national carrier of Bangladesh. Biman's subsidiaries are associated with aircraft ground handling, aviation engineering, aviation training and flight catering.

Among these wholly owned subsidiaries are Biman Flight Catering Centre; Biman Poultry Complex; Biman Ground Handling; Bangladesh Airlines Training Centre; and Biman Engineering.

Commercial divisions

Biman Flight Catering Centre

Biman Flight Catering Centre (BFCC) was set up in October 1989, to produce in-flight meals. It is one of Biman's most profitable operations; employing 2000 people.
BFCC has the capacity of producing 8,500 meals a day and along with Biman, it also provides meals to Saudia Airlines, Etihad, Malaysia Airlines, Thai Airways, Emirates, China Southern Airlines and Regent Airways.

Biman Poultry Complex

The poultry industry in Bangladesh was partly pioneered by the Biman subsidiary in the mid-1970s, although the first poultry in Bangladesh was a private venture named "Eggs and Hens" established in 1964. The medium-sized breeder set up by BPC eventually led to NGOs and the government coming forward to develop the sector in early 1990. Poultry now has "a significant role" in providing low-cost dietary protein to the Bangladesh population.

Bird flu was detected at one of the farms in March 2007, which resulted in many livestock being culled. This was the first incident of bird flu in Bangladesh.

Other

Biman Ground Handling 
Biman provides ground handling and cargo handling services to all airlines operating in Bangladesh, in all airports. Established along with Biman Bangladesh Airlines in 1972, it generated profits of BDT 4.5 billion in the FY 2011–2012, making it one of the most profitable subsidiary of Biman.

Bangladesh Airlines Training Center 

Biman Bangladesh Airlines Training Center (BATC) trains its ground, flight service and technical personnel to meet the growing needs of Biman's manpower. The center, founded in 1987, has also been turned into a seat of training and technical seminars for local travel agents and some foreign airlines.

Biman Engineering 
The aviation engineering division of Biman Bangladesh Airlines was separated from the commercial division in 2004. This step was taken in order to turn engineering independently profitable from the commercial ventures listed above.

This subsidiary is located in Biman's Engineering Hangar at Shahjalal International Airport in Dhaka.

References 

Biman Bangladesh Airlines
Lists of corporate subsidiaries